Progress in Materials Science is a journal publishing review articles covering most areas of materials science, published by the Pergamon imprint of Elsevier. It was started in 1949 with the title Progress in Metal Physics with Bruce Chalmers serving as first editor. It was changed to the current title in 1961.

External links
Progress in Materials Science

Materials science journals
Elsevier academic journals
8 times per year journals